Hafnia Hodierna, Eller Udførlig Beskrivelse om den Kongelige Residentz- og Hoved-Stad Kiøbenhavn (English: Hafnia Hodierna, Or Detailed Description of the Royal Residence and Capital City Copenhagen) is an engraved architectural work on Copenhagen, published by the Danish architect Lauritz de Thurah in 1748. Profusely illustrated throughout, it is a valuable source of knowledge as to the appearance of Copenhagen in the middle of the 18th century. It complements, with some overlap, de Thurah's other major work Den Danske Vitruvius, which focuses primarily on surrounding areas (such as Fredensborg), as well as the rest of Denmark.

In 1967,  Rosenkilde & Bagger published a facsimile edition, edited by Svend Cedergreen Bech.

Hafnia Hodierna is Latin for "Copenhagen of today".

History

Lauritz de Thurah had a  military  education and was a self-taught architect who learned much of what he knew by studying the inspiring buildings he saw on his travels outside Denmark between 1729 and 1731. His architectural writings can be seen as a natural continuation of this interest.

In 1735 he received a royal grant to collect information and to write a comprehensive work on architecture in Denmark. Hafnia Hodierna appeared in 1748, published at the King's expense, and printed by the best Danish printer at that time, Ernst Henrich Berling.

Contents
Published as a single quarto volume, Hafnia Hodierna contains 110 plates. It provides important contemporary descriptions, engraved views, and architectural plans of all the principal buildings in Copenhagen, including the three Royal Palaces, other government and public buildings, the townhouses of the aristocracy, and the city's numerous churches. All the views are the work of the skillful drawer Johan Jacob Bruun, while the plans, sections and elevations were made by others, including de Thurah personally. Text appears in Danish, French, and German in parallel columns.

Gallery

References

External links

 Digitale Sammlungen SLUB Dresden
 Digital Lbrary HathiTrust

See also
 Lauritz de Thurah
 Den Danske Vitruvius
 Architecture of Denmark

Architecture books
Danish non-fiction books
Baroque architecture in Denmark
1748 books